"Chapter Thirty-One: A Night to Remember" is the eighteenth episode of the second season of the American television series Riverdale and the thirty-first episode of the series overall. The episode was directed by Jason Stone and written by Arabella Anderson and Tessa Leigh Williams and choreographed by Heather Laura Gray. It centered around the stage musical Carrie by Lawrence D. Cohen and Michael Gore, which is based on the 1974 book of the same name by Stephen King.

The episode was first screened at the PaleyFest LA Spring Season in March 2018. It originally aired on The CW on April 18, 2018 and according to Nielsen Media Research, was watched by 1.10 million viewers.

It is also the first musical episode in the series. It is followed by five other musical episodes in the series, with some of them also based on stage musical: "Chapter Fifty-One: Big Fun" (season 3; on Heathers: The Musical), "Chapter Seventy-Four: Wicked Little Town" (season 4; on Hedwig and the Angry Inch), "Chapter Ninety-One: The Return of the Pussycats" (season 5; on Josie and the Pussycats), "Chapter Ninety-Four: Next to Normal" (season 5; on Next to Normal), and "Chapter One Hundred and Twelve: American Psychos" (season 6; on American Psycho: The Musical).

Plot 
Kevin asks Jughead to make a behind the scenes documentary for the school's production of Carrie: The Musical, the students come to school and start to rehearse ("In"), before introducing themselves to the fellow cast members. Betty is still at odds with Veronica and angry that she lied to her. Cheryl then tries to prove that she deserves the role of Carrie ("Carrie"). Afterwards, it is revealed that Kevin got a letter asking for the role of Carrie be recast, but believes it's too small a threat to be the Black Hood. Betty, Veronica, Archie, and Chuck later rehearse ("Do Me a Favor"), and afterwards, Archie asks if he can keep the Firebird at her house as his father is still unaware of it.

Jughead tells Betty about the letter and they believe it might be Ethel, who disputes their claim. Alice visits FP at work, but he seems disinterested in her. Cheryl and Josie rehearse, which causes Cheryl to apologize for her actions ("Unsuspecting Hearts"). During rehearsal ("The World According to Chris"), Betty accuses Veronica of being an embodiment of her character, but later apologizes to her ("You Shine"). Archie and Fred are working on sets for the play when Hiram mentions the Firebird, which upsets Fred. Betty discovers her mother blames herself for kicking Chic out.  

Kevin receives another letter telling them to recast Cheryl, which he is about to do when Cheryl's mother tells Cheryl she doesn't have permission, nor the personality to play Carrie. Kevin informs everyone that Carrie was recast, with Midge taking over. Toni goes to comfort Cheryl and encourages her to stand up to her mother. Alice and Midge rehearse ("Stay Here Instead"), but Alice becomes upset and runs off stage, with Betty running after her and comforting her. Archie realizes how much he's hurt his dad and goes to Hiram, telling him not to get in between him and his dad before returning the keys to the Firebird.  

On opening night, Betty arranges for Hal to come to the house and he and Alice reunite. Archie buys a beat up car from the junkyard so he and his dad could work on it together, touching Fred. The cast is in the dressing room ("A Night We'll Never Forget") getting ready, while Cheryl goes over to Thistlehouse. Cheryl confronts her mother and threatens to burn the house down, wanting emancipation, the house, and for her and Claudius to leave. FP arrives at the play but leaves after seeing that Alice and Hal made up.   

Veronica notes to Chuck how she's noticed his behavior has changed while he's been in the play. Chic enters the dressing room, surprising Betty. As the play starts, Alice begins her part ("Evening Prayers") and cues Midge, who doesn't appear. When the curtain lifts, she's revealed to be pinned against the walls with knives with a message from the Black Hood. The crowd bursts into screams upon realizing this was not part of the play.

Cast and characters

Starring 
 KJ Apa as Archie Andrews / Tommy Ross
 Lili Reinhart as Betty Cooper / Sue Snell
 Camila Mendes as Veronica Lodge / Chris Hargensen
 Cole Sprouse as Jughead Jones / The Beak
 Marisol Nichols as Hermione Lodge
 Madelaine Petsch as Cheryl Blossom / Carrie White
 Ashleigh Murray as Josie McCoy / Miss Gardner
 Mark Consuelos as Hiram Lodge
 Casey Cott as Kevin Keller
 Skeet Ulrich as F.P. Jones
 Mädchen Amick as Alice Cooper / Margaret White
 Luke Perry as Fred Andrews

Guest starring 
 Nathalie Boltt as Penelope Blossom
 Jordan Calloway as Chuck Clayton / Billy Nolan
 Martin Cummins as Tom Keller
 Hart Denton as Chic
 Vanessa Morgan as Toni Topaz / Norma
 Lochlyn Munro as Hal Cooper
 Shannon Purser as Ethel Muggs / Helen

Co-starring 
 Drew Ray Tanner as Fangs Fogarty
 Emilija Baranac as Midge Klump / Carrie White
 Cody Kearsley as Moose Mason

Music 

On April 19, 2018, WaterTower Music released the musical soundtrack from "A Night to Remember" episode performed by cast members. A vinyl edition was released at Urban Outfitters stores on July 13. The episode features music from a score of Pino Donaggio's "Bucket of Blood" on the Carrie (1976) soundtrack and Dan Auerbach's "Up on a Mountain of Love" are heard, but not included in the soundtrack. 

All tracks from Carrie: The Musical were written by Michael Gore and Dean Pitchford, respectively.

Reception

Ratings 
In the United States, the episode received a 0.4/2 percent share among adults between the ages of 18 and 49, meaning that it was seen by 0.4 percent of all households, and 2 percent of all of those watching television at the time of the broadcast. It was watched by 1.10 million viewers.

Critical response 

The review aggregator website Rotten Tomatoes reported a 100% approval rating for the episode, based on 14 reviews, with an average rating of 9.23/10. The website's critical consensus reads: "In "A Night to Remember", an uneven second season comes to a head as Riverdales first—and hopefully not last—musical episode gloriously weaves the show's many wandering threads back into its central murder-mystery yarn".

References

External links 
 
 

2018 American television episodes
Riverdale (2017 TV series) episodes
Musical television episodes
Carrie (franchise)
Fiction set in 2018